This article summarizes the events, album releases, and album release dates in hip hop music for the year 1979.

Releases

March

Fatback Band – King Tim III (Personality Jock) 
On March 25, 1979, the Fatback Band released the single King Tim III (Personality Jock) which is often cited as the first recorded hip hop song, even if a record called Enterprise was released in the play Runaways (Original Broadway Cast Recording) on July 7, 1978, is also considered as the first recorded hip hop song.

September

The Sugarhill Gang – Rapper's Delight 
On September 16, 1979, The Sugarhill Gang released the single Rapper's Delight which became the first commercially successful hip hop song. It is often mistaken as the first recorded hip hop song. In 2011, the song was preserved into the National Recording Registry by the Library of Congress stating that  the infectious dance number might have launched an entire genre.

December

Kurtis Blow – Christmas Rappin' 
Russell Simmons decided that he wanted to create a rap record with Kurtis Blow. He realized that the best way of earning money was by creating a Christmas record as it would be played every year. After playing the song for 22 labels, they finally got it released on Mercury Records. The record was eventually sold over 500,000 times.

Unknown month 
Bramsam – Move Your Body 

Dr. Superman / Lady Sweet – Can You Do It (Superman) / Back to Metropolis 

Eddie Cheba – Lookin' Good (Shake Your Body)  

Family – Family Rap 

First Class – Rappin' It Up 

Funky Constellation – Street Talk (Madam Rapper) 

Funky Four Plus One – Rappin' and Rocking the House 

Grandmaster Flash and The Furious Five – SuperRappin' 

Jocko – Rhythm Talk 

Jocko – The Rocketship 

Jazzy 4 MC's – MC Rock 

Joe Bataan – Rap-O Clap-O / El Rap-O Clap-O  

Lady B – To The Beat Y'all 

Lady D / MC Tee – Lady D / Nu Sounds 

Little Starsky – Gangster Rock 

Mr. Q – D. J. Style 

Mr. Q – Ladies Delight 

Mr. Q – Love & Time / Rapping Time 

Mr. Q – Party Party / Party Rapp  

Neil B / Brooklyn Express – Body Rock 

The Sequence – Funk You Up 

Ron Hunt / Ronnie G. & The S.M. Crew – Spiderap / A Corona Jam 

Paulett and Tanya Winley / Ann Winley – Rhymin' and Rappin' / Watch Dog 

Scoopy – Scoopy Rap 

Sicle Cell & Rhapazooty – Rhapazooty in Blue 

Spoonie Gee – Spoonin Rap 

Steve Gordon & The Kosher Five – Take My Rap... Please 

T.J. Swan – And You Know That 

Troy Rainey – Tricky Tee Rap 

Uno – Boogie Beat 

Wackie's Disco Rock Band – Wack Rap 

Willie Wood & Willie Wood Crew – Willie Rap 

Xanadu & Sweet Lady – Rappers Delight / Rockers Choice 

Younger Generation (early name of Grandmaster Flash and The Furious Five) – We Rap More Mellow

See also
Next article: 1980 in hip hop music

References

Hip hop
Hip hop music by year